Sasquatch is an S&S Worldwide combo drop tower at Six Flags Great Escape and Hurricane Harbor in Queensbury, New York. It opened on May 10, 2009.

The ride was previously located at Six Flags New Orleans under the names Bayou Blaster and Sonic Slam; after the park closed due to Hurricane Katrina in 2005, the ride was moved to Great Escape. The current name is derived from the cryptid Sasquatch.

Ride History
The ride first opened in 2000 as Bayou Blaster and Sonic Slam at a new park called Jazzland. Then Six Flags took over the lease of the park in 2002 and changed the name to Six Flags New Orleans in 2003.

After Hurricane Katrina hit the park on August 29, 2005, the park was severely flooded from the hurricane and has remained closed since. Six Flags decided to relocate several rides, such as  Batman: The Ride, which was removed in 2007 and taken to Six Flags Fiesta Texas where it was refurbished and reopened on April 18, 2008 under the new name Goliath. The Bayou Blaster and the Sonic Slam were dismantled in 2008 and relocated to Great Escape, where the ride was refurbished, repainted, and renamed Sasquatch. The ride was officially opened on May 10, 2009 on the former spot of Rainbow, which closed after the 2007 season.

Ride experience
The ride contains two shafts or towers, a lift tower and a drop tower. On the drop tower, riders are easily brought to the top and then dropped extremely fast down most of it, then brought up not as high, then dropped at the same speed. This continues several more times before the ride ends. On the lift tower, riders are shot to the top in three seconds, then dropped not as fast as the drop tower drops, then brought back up at the same speed, then dropped slowly. This continues until the ride ends like the drop tower.

The correct names for the two towers are Launch and Drop. The Launch Tower shoots passengers over  into the air in 3 seconds and slowly drops them down. The Drop tower launches passengers slowly and drops them in three seconds.

References

External links
Sasquatch official ride page

Six Flags attractions
The Great Escape and Hurricane Harbor
Drop tower rides
Amusement rides manufactured by S&S – Sansei Technologies
Amusement rides introduced in 2000